The 2014 Sutton Council election took place on 22 May 2014 to elect members of Sutton Council in England. This was on the same day as other local elections.

Results
The Liberal Democrats retained control winning 45 seats (+2) with the Conservatives winning 9 seats (−2).

|}

Ward results

Beddington North

In January 2016, Cllr Mattey was expelled from the Liberal Democrats after sighting his vocal opposition to a proposed incinerator which is set to be erected in the ward.

Beddington South

Belmont

Carshalton Central

Carshalton South & Clockhouse

Cheam

Nonsuch

St. Helier

Stonecot

Sutton Central

Sutton North

Sutton South

Sutton West

The Wrythe

Wallington North

Wallington South

Wandle Valley

Worcester Park

References

Sutton
2014